Batavia is a census-designated place (CDP) in Flathead County, Montana, United States. The population was 385 at the 2010 census.

U.S. Route 2 passes through town. It is 6 miles from Kalispell. Nearby is the Batavia Waterfowl Production Area.

Demographics

References

Census-designated places in Flathead County, Montana
Census-designated places in Montana